Dong Ling Group is a conglomerate in the mining, metallurgy, and coking industries. Dong Ling is the largest steel trader and zinc manufacturer in Western China.

External links
Official site

Companies based in Shaanxi
Mining companies of China
Companies with year of establishment missing